Hugh Bradley Long (3 January 1923 – 6 December 1988) was a Scottish footballer, who played as a left winger for Celtic, Clyde and Worcester City. Long represented Scotland once, in a 1946–47 British Home Championship match against Ireland.

Long died in Glasgow in 1988 at the age of 65.

References

1923 births
1988 deaths
Association football wingers
Celtic F.C. players
Clyde F.C. players
Scotland international footballers
Scottish Football League players
Scottish footballers
Worcester City F.C. players